(born September 6, 1998) is a Japanese weightlifter. She won the silver medal in the women's 49kg event at the 2021 World Weightlifting Championships held in Tashkent, Uzbekistan.

Career 

She competed in the women's 48kg event at the 2017 Summer Universiade held in Taipei, Taiwan.

She won the clean & jerk bronze medal in the women's 48kg event at the 2018 Junior World Weightlifting Championships held in Tashkent, Uzbekistan.

Achievements

References

External links 
 

Living people
1998 births
Place of birth missing (living people)
Japanese female weightlifters
World Weightlifting Championships medalists
Competitors at the 2017 Summer Universiade
21st-century Japanese women